Pfettrach is a river of Bavaria, Germany. It flows into the Kleine Isar, a branch of the Isar, in Landshut.

See also
List of rivers of Bavaria

References

Rivers of Bavaria
Rivers of Germany